Gabrielle Anwar is an English and American actress. She is known for her television roles as Sam Black in the second series of Press Gang, as Margaret Tudor in the first season of The Tudors, as Lady Tremaine in the seventh season of Once Upon a Time, and for her starring role as Fiona Glenanne on the USA network television series Burn Notice (2007–2013). Anwar is also known for the 1991 film Wild Hearts Can't Be Broken, for dancing the tango with Al Pacino in the 1992 film Scent of a Woman, and for the 1993 films Body Snatchers and For Love or Money.

Early life 
Anwar was born in Laleham, Surrey. Her mother, Shirley Hills, is an actress, and her father, Tariq Anwar, is a film producer and editor. Her paternal grandmother was an Austrian Jew, while her paternal grandfather was an Indian Muslim. Anwar attended Laleham C of E Primary and Middle School from 1975 to 1982; an end-of-term St Trinian's sketch in the school concert of 1982 gave an early indication of her theatrical leanings. She studied drama and dance at the Italia Conti Academy of Theatre Arts in London.

Career 
Anwar's acting debut was in the 1986 British miniseries Hideaway. She also starred in the music video to Paul McCartney's "Pretty Little Head". Her film début was Manifesto (1988), which was followed by more British television productions including First Born, Summer's Lease, Press Gang, and The Mysteries of the Dark Jungle. While working on films and television in London, she met American actor Craig Sheffer, and moved with him to Hollywood. Anwar and Sheffer have co-starred in a number of American films together, such as In Pursuit of Honor, The Grave, Turbulence 3: Heavy Metal, Flying Virus, Save It for Later, Water Under the Bridge, and Long Lost Son.

Her first American film was If Looks Could Kill, in which she played the daughter of a murdered British agent (played by Roger Daltrey). She also appeared in Tom Petty and the Heartbreakers' music video for Into the Great Wide Open.  In 1992, she made a guest appearance on Beverly Hills, 90210 as competitive ice skater Tricia Kinney, who has a brief romance with Brandon Walsh. She starred in Wild Hearts Can't Be Broken (inspired by A Girl and Five Brave Horses), and one of her most memorable moments on screen was in 1992's Scent of a Woman, when she danced a tango with Al Pacino, whose character was blind. She followed that with the films Body Snatchers, For Love or Money, and The Three Musketeers. In 1994, People magazine named her one of the 50 most beautiful people in the world. In 1995, she starred in Things to Do in Denver When You're Dead.

In 2000, Anwar played Sophie in The Guilty. She also appeared in the television series John Doe (2002-2003) and acted in The Librarian: Return to King Solomon's Mines (2006). In 2007, she played Princess Margaret, sister of King Henry VIII, on Showtime's The Tudors. After that, she starred as Fiona Glenanne in the long-running television series Burn Notice from 2007 to 2013.  In 2008, Anwar made an appearance as Eva Sintzel, a woman trying to get pregnant through the fictitious Hudson Cryobank in the Law & Order: SVU episode "Inconceivable". She also played a role in the seventh season of Once Upon a Time.

Personal life 
Anwar and actor Craig Sheffer had a daughter, born 1993, before separating. She was later married to actor John Verea, with whom she had a son and a daughter, before divorcing. Sheffer is godfather to Anwar's two later children.

Anwar became a U.S. citizen in 2008.

In April 2010, Anwar began dating Shareef Malnik, son of Alvin Malnik. In August 2015, they were married in Montana. They live in Palm Island, Florida.

Filmography

Film

Television

Music videos 
 Pretty Little Head (1986), by Paul McCartney
 Into the Great Wide Open (1991), by Tom Petty and the Heartbreakers, as Eddie's girlfriend

Award nominations

References

External links 

 
 

20th-century English actresses
21st-century English actresses
21st-century American actresses
Actresses from Surrey
Alumni of the Italia Conti Academy of Theatre Arts
British expatriate actresses in the United States
English film actresses
English people of Austrian-Jewish descent
English people of Indian descent
English television actresses
American people of Austrian-Jewish descent
British actresses of Indian descent
American actresses of Indian descent
Living people
People with acquired American citizenship
Year of birth missing (living people)